Pryberezhne  is a rural settlement in Bilhorod-Dnistrovskyi Raion in the Odesa Oblast of Ukraine. It belongs to Shabo rural hromada, one of the hromadas of Ukraine.

Demographics
According to the 1989 Soviet census, the population of the village was 162 people, of whom 70 were men and 92 women.

According to the 2001 Ukrainian census, 255 people lived in the village.

Languages 
According to the 2001 census, the primary languages of the inhabitants of the village were:

References 

Rural settlements in Odesa Oblast